Viktors Bļinovs (born 26 June 1981) is a Latvian ice hockey forward, currently playing for Berkut Kyiv of the Ukrainian Hockey League.

For the Latvian national ice hockey team he has played in three World Championships. During 2008-09 Bļinovs also played 24 games for the Kontinental Hockey League club Dinamo Riga.

External links

1981 births
Living people
Ice hockey people from Riga
Latvian ice hockey forwards
Dinamo Riga players
HC Salamat players
Vaasan Sport players
Metallurg Zhlobin players
HC Shakhtyor Soligorsk players
HK Liepājas Metalurgs players